Sunu Wahyu Trijati (born 26 April 1987) is an Indonesian professional tennis player.

Trijati, a native of Jakarta, made his Davis Cup debut for Indonesia in 2005. He has featured in a total of 13 ties, the last in 2017, for three singles and four doubles wins.

A regular participant in the Southeast Asian Games, Trijati has won five medals in tennis and in 2019 won a further medal as a member of Indonesia's soft tennis team.

See also
List of Indonesia Davis Cup team representatives

References

External links
 
 
 

1987 births
Living people
Indonesian male tennis players
Sportspeople from Jakarta
Southeast Asian Games medalists in tennis
Southeast Asian Games silver medalists for Indonesia
Southeast Asian Games bronze medalists for Indonesia
Competitors at the 2005 Southeast Asian Games
Competitors at the 2009 Southeast Asian Games
Competitors at the 2015 Southeast Asian Games
Competitors at the 2019 Southeast Asian Games
Universiade medalists in tennis
Universiade bronze medalists for Indonesia
Medalists at the 2007 Summer Universiade
Southeast Asian Games medalists in soft tennis
Islamic Solidarity Games competitors for Indonesia
Islamic Solidarity Games medalists in tennis
Competitors at the 2011 Summer Universiade
21st-century Indonesian people